Kostievo is a village in southern Bulgaria, located in Plovdiv Province, Maritsa Municipality. As of the June 2020 Bulgarian census, the village has a population count of 1788 people.

Geography 
Kostievo is located at an elevation of 175 meters above sea level, in the Upper Thracian Plain. It is 3 kilometers North from Maritsa and 11 kilometers West from Plovdiv. The total land area of the village's region is 23,695  square kilometers.

History 
According to Ottoman documents the village exists since 1576. Its former name used to be Kioste.

Infrastructure 
The local church of the village dates back to 1889. In 1929, the school of the village was built and still works until now. Nowadays, it bears the name of "Sv, Sv. Kiril I Metodii".

The community Hall in the village was built in 1928, and was named after "Tsar Boris III". The current building of the community hall was built in 1942. 

The majority of the village works in animal husbandry, crop production and rice production.  Since 2001, the village has a pharmacy. In 1991, a kindergarten was founded in the village and is still functioning.

References 

Villages in Plovdiv Province